Sibualbuali is a stratovolcano in northern Sumatra, Indonesia. It has two solfatara fields on the eastern flank. There is a rhyolitic-dacitic lava dome, erupted from the Toru-Asik fault.

See also 

 List of volcanoes in Indonesia

References 

Volcanoes of Sumatra
Stratovolcanoes of Indonesia
Mountains of Sumatra
Pleistocene stratovolcanoes